Michael Peter O'Shea (born 4 September 1987) is a Welsh cricketer who has played for Glamorgan and Unicorns. He is a right-handed batsman and a right-arm off spin bowler.

He toured India in early 2005 with the England Under-19s, playing three youth Tests and four youth One Day Internationals.  O'Shea made his debut in senior cricket in 2005, representing Wales Minor Counties in a Cheltenham & Gloucester Trophy match against Nottinghamshire, being dismissed for a golden duck.  He made three first-class appearances for Glamorgan later that season, before travelling to Bangladesh to represent England Under-19s in a tri-series against Bangladesh and Sri Lanka.

In 2010, O'Shea was selected as one of 21 players to form the first Unicorns squad to take part in the Clydesdale Bank 40 domestic limited overs competition against the regular first-class counties. The Unicorns were made up of 15 former county cricket professionals and 6 young cricketers looking to make it in the professional game.

References

1987 births
Living people
Sportspeople from Barry, Vale of Glamorgan
Cricketers from the Vale of Glamorgan
Welsh cricketers
Welsh people of Irish descent
Glamorgan cricketers
Unicorns cricketers
Wales National County cricketers
Herefordshire cricketers